Viktoria Karlsson (born 27 January 1997) is a partially blind Swedish Paralympic athlete who competes in long jump events in international level events. She was a former para cross-country skier who competed in international level.

Life
Karlsson was born in 1997 in Soderhamn. By the time she was five she had lost her eyesight due to cancer which started when she was eighteen months old. In 2004 she became a long jumper after she got involved in athletics because the parents thought she would benefit. She won a gold medal at the 2014 IPC Athletics European Championships. 

In 2016 Jeremy Pryce became her coach and she joined the Goteborgs KIK club. Two years later she was competing in the T11 category in Berlin where she won another gold medal after being Sweden's flag bearer at the 2018 European Championships. 

The following year she tried Para cross-country skiing.

In 2020 she was supported financially by a campaign which raised money from Swedes who bought a particular pillow. The money was shared between judoka Nicolina Pernheim, cyclist Louise Jannering and Karlsson in order that they could fund guides prior to the postponed 2020 Summer Paralympics in Tokyo. Karlsson's guide is Sofia Sandgren.

Karlsson's best jump is 4.56 metres which is a Swedish record.

References

1997 births
Living people
Athletes from Gothenburg
Paralympic athletes of Sweden
Swedish female long jumpers
Athletes (track and field) at the 2016 Summer Paralympics
Visually impaired long jumpers
Paralympic long jumpers
21st-century Swedish women